The Divorce is an Australian comedy opera miniseries which was broadcast on ABC TV on four successive nights from 7 to 10 December 2015. The four-part series is written by Joanna Murray-Smith with music by Elena Kats-Chernin. Based on an original idea by Lyndon Terracini, it was developed by Opera Australia and directed for television by Dean Murphy. Outside filming took place at Werribee Park Mansion west of Melbourne. The work was shown again in 2017 in a single 95-minute broadcast on Sky Arts and ABC TV.

Plot
Wealthy couple Iris (Marina Prior) and art critic Jed (John O'May) are happily getting a divorce and throwing an elaborate party. By the end of the evening, Iris and Jed's divorce has triggered a renegotiation of all certainties and the characters are set on an unanticipated course. Louise (Lisa McCune), the younger sister of Iris is secretly in love with art critic Jed. Toby (Hugh Sheridan) is an aspiring artist, hired to work as a waiter at the party. William (Matthew McFarlane) is Iris' young and handsome lover, an accountant who lacks charisma. Caroline (Kate Miller-Heidke) is Jed and Iris' personal assistant who is in trouble with loan sharks Alfie and Ludo. Patrick (Peter Cousens) and Ellen (Melissa Madden Gray) are the best friends of Jed and Iris.

Cast
Lisa McCune as Louise
Marina Prior as Iris
Hugh Sheridan as Toby
Kate Miller-Heidke as Caroline
John O'May as Jed
 as William
Peter Cousens as Patrick
Melissa Madden Gray as Ellen
Bob Franklin as Alfie, a loan shark
Dom Phelan as Ludo, a loan shark
Nick Capper, the courier

Soundtrack

Universal Music Australia partnered with the production company, Princess Pictures, to release the soundtrack to The Divorce. Elena Kats-Chernin's score was nominated for the 2016 AACTA Award for Best Original Music Score in Television and for ARIA Award for Best Original Soundtrack, Cast or Show Album at the ARIA Music Awards of 2016.

Track listing
Overture
Goodbye My Love – Marina Prior, John O'May
They Had Perfection – Chorus
Chilling Champagne – Kate Miller-Heidke
Greetings – Chorus
Other Ships – Marina Prior, Kate Miller-Heidke
Love and Fear – Melissa Madden Gray, Peter Cousens
Cosmopolitan Penguin – Hugh Sheridan
Tick Tock – Lisa McCune
Have you Lost All Love for Jed – Lisa McCune, Marina Prior
Sister, Sister – Lisa McCune
Company, Canapés, Drinks – Chorus
Love Love Bitter – Chorus
At Last – Lisa McCune
Dismemberment – Kate Miller Heidke, Matthew MacFarlane
Appetites – Kate Miller-Heidke
Old Friend, Congratulations – Melissa Madden Gray, Peter Cousens
The Proposal – Marina Prior
Cradle Snatchers – Chorus
What's Going On, What Did She Say – Chorus
No More Notes/I Cannot Wait – Lisa McCune
What's Going On With Caroline – Chorus
Grizzly Remains – Kate Miller-Heidke
I've Told Lou – John O'May
The Way the Light Plays – Lisa McCune, Hugh Sheridan
As a Child – Matthew MacFarlane
The Key – Melissa Madden Gray, Matthew MacFarlane
The Waiter – Lisa McCune
No Gentle Way – Lisa McCune
Hail Jehovah! – Melissa Madden Gray, Peter Cousens, Matthew MacFarlene, Marina Prior, Lisa McCune, Kate Miller-Heidke, Hugh Sheridan, Chorus
The Fitting Glove – Hugh Sheridan
A Charismatic Force – Marina Prior, John O'May
You Laughed, You Kissed – Chorus

References

External links
The Divorce, production details
The Divorce, ABC TV
The Divorce, Opera Australia
"The Divorce: Putting the Opera into the Soap" by Andrew Aronowicz, Limelight, 1 December 2015

"It's TV! It's opera! What to make of ABC's The Divorce", review by Michael Halliwell, The Conversation, 9 December 2015

Australian Broadcasting Corporation original programming
2015 Australian television series debuts
2015 Australian television series endings
2010s Australian television miniseries
Australian comedy-drama television series
Australian music television series
English-language television shows
Compositions by Elena Kats-Chernin
Operas
English-language operas
English comic operas
Operas set in Australia
Operas for television
2015 operas
Operas by Elena Kats-Chernin